Pamela Bairstow (born 15 April 1954) is a British former swimmer. She competed in two events at the 1972 Summer Olympics.

References

External links
 

1954 births
Living people
British female swimmers
Olympic swimmers of Great Britain
Swimmers at the 1972 Summer Olympics
Sportspeople from Halifax, West Yorkshire